Jean Haag was a Swiss footballer. He played in seven matches for the Switzerland national football team from 1922 to 1927. He was also part of Switzerland's squad for the football tournament at the 1924 Summer Olympics, but he did not play in any matches.

References

External links
 

Year of birth missing
Year of death missing
Swiss men's footballers
Switzerland international footballers
Place of birth missing
Association football midfielders
Grasshopper Club Zürich players
Olympic footballers of Switzerland
Footballers at the 1924 Summer Olympics
Olympic medalists in football
Olympic silver medalists for Switzerland
Medalists at the 1924 Summer Olympics